John J. Winter (October 27, 1866 – July 1, 1946) was a Minnesota politician and farmer who was a member of the Minnesota House of Representatives from the 46th district.

References

External links 

1866 births
1946 deaths
People from Stearns County, Minnesota
Members of the Minnesota House of Representatives
19th-century American politicians